Borja Manuel Llarena Barroso (born 17 May 1999) is a Spanish footballer who plays as a forward.

Club career
Born in Santa Cruz de Tenerife, Canary Islands, Llarena joined CD Tenerife's youth setup in 2011, from AD Cardonal Laguna. He made his debut as a senior with the reserves during the 2017–18 campaign, appearing for the side during the Copa Federación de España.

On 21 January 2018 Llarena made his first team debut, coming on as a late substitute for Juan Carlos in a 1–3 home loss against FC Barcelona B in the Segunda División championship. On 26 September 2020, he was loaned to Segunda División B side CD Marino for the season.

References

External links
Tenerife profile 

1999 births
Living people
Spanish footballers
Footballers from Santa Cruz de Tenerife
Association football forwards
Segunda División players
Primera Federación players
Segunda División B players
Segunda Federación players
Tercera División players
CD Tenerife B players
CD Tenerife players
CD Marino players
UE Costa Brava players
Gernika Club footballers